Ignaz Jakob Holzbauer (18 September 1711 – 7 April 1783) was an Austrian composer of symphonies, concertos, operas, and chamber music, and a member of the Mannheim school. His aesthetic style is in line with that of the Sturm und Drang "movement" of German art and literature.

Biography
Holzbauer was born in Vienna. Despite the opposition of his parents, who intended him for the law, he studied music, and in 1745 became kapellmeister to Count Rottal and at the Court Theatre of Vienna. Later he was kapellmeister at Stuttgart, Germany. His operas include Il figlio delle selve, which was the opening performance of the Schlosstheater Schwetzingen in 1753. Its success led to a job offer from the court at Mannheim, Germany, where he stayed for the rest of his life, continuing to compose and to teach, his students including Johann Anton Friedrich Fleischmann (1766–1798), the pianist, and Carl Stamitz. Holzbauer died in Mannheim, having been entirely deaf for some years.

His opera Günther von Schwarzburg, based on the life of the eponymous king (and described here), was an early German national opera, a performance of which Mozart and his sister attended, through which they met Anton Raaff, who was later to premiere a role in Idomeneo. This opera has recently been recorded on the label cpo. Holzbauer wrote 196 symphonies.

Mozart also  composed nine numbers for insertion in a Miserere by Holzbauer on commission by the Parisian Concert Spirituel in 1778, but they have been lost. They have been given the catalog number KV 297a in the list of Mozart's works.

Operas
Lucio Papirio (dramma per musica,  libretto by Apostolo Zeno, 1737, Holleschau)
Sesostri, re d'Egitto (dramma per musica, libretto by  Zeno, 1738, Holleschau)
Vologeso (dramma per musica, libretto by Zeno, 1739, Holleschau)
Hypermnestra (German opera, libretto by Johann Leopold van Ghelen, 1741, Vienna)
La fata meravigliosa (dramma giocoso per musica, 1748, Vienna)
Il figlio delle selve (favola pastorale per musica, libretto by Carlo Sigismondo Capece, 1753, Schwetzingen)
L'isola disabitata (azione per musica, libretto by Pietro Metastasio, 1754, Schwetzingen)
L'Isspile (dramma per musica, libretto by  Metastasio, 1754, Mannheim)
Il Don Chisciotte (opera semiridicola, libretto by Zeno, 1755, Schwetzingen)
I cinesi (componimento drammatico per musica, libretto by  Metastasio and Mattia Verazi, 1756, Schwetzingen)
Le nozze d'Arianna (festa teatrale per musica, libretto by Verazi, 1756, Schwetzingen)
La clemenza di Tito (dramma per musica, libretto by Metastasio and Verazi, 1757, Mannheim)
Nitteti (dramma per musica, libretto by Metastasio, 1758, Mannheim)
Alessandro nell'Indie (dramma per musica, libretto by Metastasio, 1759, Milan)
Ippolito ed Aricia (dramma per musica, libretto by Carlo Innocenzo Frugoni and Verazi, 1759, Mannheim)
Günther von Schwarzburg (singspiel, libretto by Anton Klein, 1777, Mannheim)
La morte di Didone (revised as Tod der Dido) (singspiel, based on a libretto by Metastasio, 1779, Mannheim)
Tancredi (dramma per musica, 1783, Monaco)

Orchestral Works (partial list)
Flute Concerto in A major
Flute Concerto in E minor
Flute Concerto No. 1 in D major
Flute Concerto No. 2 in D major
Oboe Concerto in D minor
Symphony in D minor
Symphony in G major
Symphony in A major, Op. 2, No. 4
Symphony in E♭ major, Op. 3, No. 1
Symphony in D major, Op. 3, No. 4

Choral Works (partial list)
Missa in C major
Missa Brevissima

Pupils
Maddalena Allegranti (1754-1829), Opera singer

Notes

References
Announcement of a 2007 concert with a sinfonia concertante by Holzbauer
Brief biography
The story of KV297a

External links

Incomplete discography
Lawrence Bennett

1711 births
1783 deaths
18th-century German composers
18th-century classical composers
18th-century German male musicians
German Classical-period composers
German male classical composers
German opera composers
Male opera composers
Deaf classical musicians
German deaf people